The People's Party ( Ḥizb aš-Šaʿb) was a Syrian political party that dominated Syrian politics during the 1950s and the early 1960s. The party was officially founded in August 1948 by Rushdi al-Kikhiya, Nazem al-Qudsi and Mustafa bey Barmada. It saw its greatest levels of support among Aleppo merchants, bankers and those in agriculture in surrounding areas. It supported closer ties with Hashemite-ruled Iraq and Jordan, although some members also supported closer ties with Lebanon. Similar to its rival, the National Party, it was also popular among landowners and landlords.

In recent years there have been discussions about reviving the party in some form following the liberalization of requirements for membership in the National Progressive Front, but this has not materialized.

Leaders

References

Bibliography

1925 establishments in Mandatory Syria
1963 disestablishments in Syria
Defunct liberal political parties
Defunct political parties in Syria
Liberal parties in Asia
National liberal parties
Nationalist parties in Syria
Political parties disestablished in 1963
Political parties established in 1925